Gaillardia  (common name blanket flower) is a genus of flowering plants in the family Asteraceae, native to North and South America. It was named after Maître Gaillard de Charentonneau, an 18th-century French magistrate who was an enthusiastic botanist. The common name may refer to the resemblance of the inflorescence to the brightly patterned blankets made by Native Americans, or to the ability of wild taxa to blanket the ground with colonies. Many cultivars have been bred for ornamental use.

Description
These are annual or perennial herbs or subshrubs, sometimes with rhizomes. The stem is usually branching and erect to a maximum height around 80 centimeters (31.5 inches). The leaves are alternately arranged. Some taxa have only basal leaves. They vary in shape. They are glandular in most species. The inflorescence is a solitary flower head. The head can have 15 or more ray florets, while some taxa lack any ray florets. They can be almost any shade of yellow, orange, red, purplish, brown, white, or bicolored. They are sometimes rolled into a funnel shape. There are many tubular disc florets at the center of the head in a similar range of colors, and usually tipped with hairs. The fruit usually has a pappus of scales.

Ecology
Gaillardia species are used as food plants by the caterpillars of some Lepidoptera species, including Schinia bina (which has been recorded on G. pulchella), Schinia masoni (which feeds exclusively on G. aristata) and Schinia volupia (which feeds exclusively on G. pulchella).

Symbolism
It is the official flower of Wallonia.
The school colors of Texas State University are maroon and old gold, a combination inspired by the gaillardia.

Species

Species include:

 Gaillardia aestivalis (Walter) H.Rock – lanceleaf blanketflower southeastern USA
 Gaillardia amblyodon J.Gay – maroon blanketflower - Texas
 Gaillardia aristata Pursh – common gaillardia  - Canada, northern + western USA
 Gaillardia arizonica A.Gray – Arizona blanketflower - Sonora, southwestern USA
 Gaillardia cabrerae  (Lihue Calel, Argentina)
 Gaillardia coahuilensis B.L.Turner – bandanna daisy - Coahuila, Texas
 Gaillardia comosa A.Gray - northern Mexico
 Gaillardia doniana (Hook. & Arn.) Griseb. - Argentina 
 Gaillardia gypsophila B.L.Turner - Coahuila
 Gaillardia henricksonii B.L.Turner - Coahuila
 Gaillardia megapotamica (Spreng.) Baker - Argentina – boton de oro 
 Gaillardia megapotamica var. radiata  (San Luis, Argentina)
 Gaillardia megapotamica var. scabiosoides 
 Gaillardia mexicana A.Gray - northeastern Mexico
 Gaillardia multiceps Greene – onion blanketflower - Arizona, Texas, New Mexico
 Gaillardia parryi Greene – Parry's blanketflower - Utah, Arizona
 Gaillardia pinnatifida Torr. – red dome blanketflower - northern Mexico, western USA
 Gaillardia powellii B.L.Turner - Coahuila
 Gaillardia pulchella Foug. – firewheel - southern + central USA, central Canada, northern Mexico
 Gaillardia serotina (Walter) H. Rock - southeastern USA
 Gaillardia spathulata A.Gray – western blanketflower - Utah, Colorado
 Gaillardia suavis (A.Gray & Engelm.) Britton & Rusby – perfumeballs - northeastern Mexico, south-central USA
 Gaillardia tontalensis  (San Juan Province, Argentina)
 Gaillardia turneri Averett & A.M.Powell - Chihuahua

Hybrids
 Gaillardia × grandiflora hort. ex Van Houtte [G. aristata ×  G. pulchella]

Formerly placed here
 Helenium amarum (Raf.) H.Rock var. amarum (as G. amara Raf.)
 Tetraneuris acaulis (Pursh) Greene var. acaulis (as G. acaulis Pursh)

Gallery

References

Further reading
 
 

 
Asteraceae genera